We Live Here is the seventh studio album by the Pat Metheny Group. It won the Grammy Award for Best Contemporary Jazz Album in 1996.

Track listing

Personnel
 Pat Metheny – guitars, guitar synthesizer
 Lyle Mays – piano, keyboards
 Steve Rodby – acoustic and electric bass
 Paul Wertico – drums
 David Blamires – vocals
 Mark Ledford – vocals, trumpet, Flugelhorn, Whistling
 Luis Conte – percussion

Additional musicians
 Sammy Merendino – drum programming
 Dave Samuels – cymbal rolls

Awards
Grammy Awards

References

Pat Metheny albums
1995 albums
Geffen Records albums
Grammy Award for Best Contemporary Jazz Album